Emily Sophie Hastings Brooke  (born November 1985) is a British inventor, industrial designer and entrepreneur known for having developed the Beryl (formerly Blaze) Laserlights used for Santander Cycles (the London bike rental scheme).

Beryl Laserlights
She developed the laser as part of a project in her final year at the University of Brighton and was entered into an entrepreneurship programme in Boston (funded by Santander). After graduating in 2011 she developed the project further by listing the concept on Kickstarter, gaining attention from Transport for London as well as securing funding from the family of Richard Branson. Her firm, Blaze, was then successful in securing support from Santander who now use the lights on all of the bikes within the Santander Cycles scheme. In May 2018, following a lawsuit from a US registered company also with the name Blaze, Brooke changed her company name to Beryl.

She was appointed MBE in the 2017 Birthday Honours; "For Services to the Economyand Transport".

Her company, Beryl, sells the "Laserlight" and a range of other cycle lights, and also operates dockless cycle sharing schemes in several cities around the UK.

Revent
In 2021, Brooke was one of the founding partners of Revent, an early-stage venture capital fund aiming to support "Founders who share our belief that the greatest and most important opportunity is ... to tackle a problem that truly matters".

References

External links
 Beryl (formerly Blaze) website

English industrial designers
1985 births
21st-century British inventors
Product designers
Living people
Alumni of the University of Brighton
Women inventors